Ranunculus lapponicus, the Lapland buttercup, is distributed all over the arctic, with the exception of northern and eastern Greenland.

It is a low, prostrate plant with a creeping, underground stem (rhizome) which sends out long stalks and shoots bearing the flowers. The leaves are deeply tripartite, forming 3 lobes which are toothed or crenated. The flowers are yellow, solitary, generally having 6 (8) petals that are distinctly longer than the sepals. After flowering, the fruit forms a globular head of carpels held above the creeping plant.

It grows in wet localities, especially in moss carpets along beaches, streams and lakes.

References

External links
 

lapponicus
Flora of the Arctic
Flora of Norway
Flora of Finland
Flora of Sweden
Flora of Russia
Flora of Northern Canada
Flora of North America
Plants described in 1753
Taxa named by Carl Linnaeus